Van Wieringen is a surname. Notable people with the surname include:

Cornelis Claesz van Wieringen ( 1576–1633), Dutch Golden Age painter
Dominique Van Wieringen (born 1995), Canadian racing driver
Pieter van Wieringen (1903–1997), Dutch fencer